Kerwin House may refer to:

Cranmer House (Denver, Colorado), also known as Kerwin House, listed on the National Register of Historic Places (NRHP)
Judge J. C. Kerwin House, Neenah, Wisconsin, also NRHP-listed